The Type 143 Albatros class was a German class of missile bearing fast attack craft. Each vessel is named after a bird of prey including the albatross, condor and cormorant. Constructed by German shipbuilders Lürssen and Kröger, the vessels were intended to replace the Type 141 . The German Navy retired the class in 2005 and sold the boats off to Tunisia and Ghana.

Design

General characteristics
The requirements for the design were finalized in October 1966 and the order placed in July 1972. The Type 143s were constructed of composite hulls, designed by Lürssen, displacing 398 tonnes. They had a complement of 40.

The craft were powered by four MTU 16V 956 TB91 diesels creating  driving four shafts.

Armament and electronics
The class was armed with two OTO-Melara 76 mm guns for anti-ship and anti-air warfare. They were placed in single mounts fore and aft. The vessels were also armed with four MM38 Exocet anti-ship missiles situated in two dual mounts aft but forward of the rear 76 mm gun. The class was also equipped with two  torpedo tubes that fired Seal wire-guided torpedoes. The tubes were aft-launching.

The class is equipped with SMA 3 RM 20 navigational radar and WM27 surface search and fire-control radar. For countermeasures, they are provided with a Buck-Wegmann  Hot Dog decoy launcher and a DAG 2200 Wolke chaff launcher.

List of ships

Service history
S61—S65 were part of the 2. Schnellboot Geschwader (Fast attack craft squadron), and S66—S70 belonged to the 7. Schnellbootgeschwader. Both squadrons were based in Warnemünde.

Export
Tunisia acquired six boats from Germany in 2005. The six craft had their Exocet missile launchers removed before transfer but retained their guns and torpedo launchers.
In July 2010, it was reported that Ghana had purchased two vessels from Germany for €28 million.

Notes

References

 Gardiner, Robert; Chumbley, Stephen & Budzbon, Przemysław (1995). Conway's All the World's Fighting Ships 1947-1995. Annapolis, Maryland: Naval Institute Press. .
 

Cold War missile boats of Germany
Missile boat classes
Missile boats of the German Navy